Jihad The Trail of Political Islam (French: Jihad: Expansion et Déclin de l"Islamisme) is a book by French author and scholar Gilles Kepel.  It was originally published in French in 2000 by Gallimard, with English translations by Anthony F. Roberts from Belknap Press in 2002 and I.B. Tauris in 2006.

The book  provides a detailed examination of the expansion and decline of what he terms the doomed extremist ideology of the Jihadist movement since the 1960s.  The author explains  the attraction of Islamism to humiliated and faltering segments of the Muslim population and outlines its severe shortcomings.

Notes

References 
 

Non-fiction books about jihadism
Éditions Gallimard books
2000 non-fiction books